Railway Unions in Australia organised labour of railway employees in Australia operated under federal and State awards - this is a partial list of known unions.  Many of the unions amalgamated over time, creating a complex trail of ancestry for some of the later unions.

Federal Award unions

The following unions were based on federal - Australian wide awards 

 Association of Railway Professional Officers of Australia (1921 - )
 Australian Federated Union of Locomotive Enginemen
 Australian Rail Tram & Bus Industry Union, RTBU (1993 - )
 Australian Railways Union, ARU (1921 - 1993)
 Australian Tramway and Motor Omnibus Employees' Association
 Australian Transport Officers' Federation
 Commonwealth Engine Drivers & Firemens Association of Australia (1918 - 1925)
 Commonwealth Railway Officers Association (1917 - 1950)
 Federated Tramways Officers Association (1920 - 1949)
 National Union of Rail Workers of Australia (1982 - 1993)

New South Wales 
 Australian Railways Union - N.S.W. Branch

South Australia
 Australian Railways Union - South Australian Branch 
 Australasian Society of Engineers - South Australia

Tasmania
 Australian Railways Union - Tasmanian Branch

Victoria
 Australian Federated Union of Locomotive Enginemen (Victorian Division) 
 Australian Railways Union - Victoria 
 Victorian Railways Transportation Employees Association (1906 - 1950)
 Train & Locomotive Drivers Association of Victoria (2017 - )

Western Australia

Some of the following unions were the railway related unions in Western Australia.

 Association of Draughting, Supervisory and Technical Employees  
 Amalgamated Society of Railway Employees (see below, Western Australian...)
 Australian Railways Union (Western Australian Branch) 
 Railway Industry Council 
 Rail Tram and Bus Industry Union 
 Western Australian Amalgamated Society of Railway Employees' Union of Workers 
 Western Australian Association of State Railway Employees   
 Locomotive Engine Drivers’ Firemen's and Cleaners’ Union of Western Australia
(earlier known as West Australian Locomotive Engine Drivers' Firemen's and Cleaners' Union of Workers)
 West Australian Railway Officers’ Union 
 Western Australian Railway Unions Joint Executive 
 West Australian Vehicle Builders’ Industrial Union of Workers

Records and archives
The Noel Butlin Archives Centre at Australian National University is one of the more significant repositories of railway union records in Australia

Notes

Trade unions in Australia
Railway unions in Australia